Oregon Health & Science University (OHSU) has an extensive art collection, the OHSU Collection, with approximately 900 artworks displayed throughout the institution's campus in Portland, Oregon. The collection emphasizes Pacific Northwest art and artists.

History
The OHSU Marquam Hill Art Committee was created in 1984 to add art throughout the institution's Marquam Hill campus. The art collection was established in 1985 with nine paintings by Carl Morris. In 1995, an anonymous donor funded art for the Doernbecher Children's Hospital, further expanding OHSU's collection.

Artworks
Artworks in the Marquam Hill collection include:
 Big Balance (1997), Frank Boyden and Brad Rude
 Blind Man and Loon (1995), Jacque and Mary Regat
 Intersecting Light (1984), Carl Morris
 New Friends, Two Eves (1999), Mary Josephson
 Oregon Fabric (1994), Bruce West
 Sibyls (1997), Dinh Q Le'
 Towers and Rocks (2007), Jack Portland
 Trust (2005), Kim Osgood
 Vita Mensae Living Mind, Life of Thought (1992), Larry Kirkland, Center for Research on Occupational and Environmental Toxicology (CROET)

The Peter O. Kohler Pavilion's (formerly Patient Care Facility) terrace features Mother and Child and Standing Lady Hare with Dog.

Christian Moeller's  galvanized steel sculpture is installed outside the Collaborative Life Sciences Building.

Publications

References

External links
About Art on the Hill

Oregon Health & Science University
Art in Oregon
Oregon Health & Science University
Tourist attractions in Portland, Oregon